Consent is defined as when one person voluntarily agrees to the proposal or desires of another.

Consent may also refer to:

 Sexual consent, voluntary agreement to engage in sexual acts
Informed consent, obtaining subject approval for medical procedures
 Consent (BDSM), consent as it relates to BDSM
 Consent (criminal law), a defense against criminal liability
 Consent (roleplaying), how much control a player has over their character in a role-playing game
 Consent (play), a 2017 play by Nina Raine
 Consent (film), a 2023 TV film made for Channel 4